Lodovico Nulli (20 February 1891 – 18 March 1962) was an Italian sports shooter. He competed in the 50 m rifle event at the 1936 Summer Olympics.

References

External links
 

1891 births
1962 deaths
Italian male sport shooters
Olympic shooters of Italy
Shooters at the 1936 Summer Olympics
Sportspeople from Brescia